Charles Earle Raven  (4 July 1885 – 8 July 1964) was an English theologian, Regius Professor of Divinity at Cambridge, and Master of Christ's College, Cambridge.  His works have been influential in the history of science publishing on the positive effects that theology has had upon modern science.

Career

Raven was born in Paddington, London on 4 July 1885, and was educated at Uppingham School. He obtained an open classical scholarship at Gonville and Caius College, Cambridge, and then became lecturer in divinity, fellow and dean of Emmanuel College, Cambridge. In 1932, he was elected Regius Professor of Divinity at Cambridge, a position he held until 1950. He was Master of Christ's College, Cambridge (1939–1950).

He was a clergyman in the Church of England, and attained the rank of canon. During the First World War he served as a chaplain to the forces and what he witnessed led him to take a pacifist position, a subject on which he wrote extensively for the rest of his life. As a pacifist, he was an active supporter of the Peace Pledge Union and the Fellowship of Reconciliation.

He first married Margaret Ermyntrude Buchanan Wollaston in 1910, with whom he had four children. Raven was the father of John Raven, the classical scholar and botanist, and grandfather of Andrew Raven and Sarah Raven.

His third marriage was to Hélène Jeanty, a Belgian widow whose husband had been killed by the occupying Germans in World War II.  They met while she was working for the World Council of Churches (WCC).  They worked together on reconciliation between students of different races, a continuation of her WCC work helping displaced Jews and Germans.  She outlived Raven, dying on 9 October 1990 and, continuing the charitable work during her lifetime, left £150,000 to Christ's College to support medical students from overseas.

Raven was the Gifford Lecturer for 1950–1952 in Natural Religion and Christian Theology, at Edinburgh University. He was president of the Field Studies Council from 1953 to 1957 and of the Botanical Society of the British Isles from 1951 to 1955. He won the James Tait Black Award in 1947 for his book English Naturalists from Neckam to Ray.

Some of his writings have been described as an early example of ecotheology.

Evolution

Raven was an advocate of non-Darwinian evolutionary theories such as Lamarckism. He also supported the theistic evolution of Pierre Teilhard de Chardin.

Historian Peter J. Bowler has written that Raven's book The Creator Spirit, "outlined the case for a nonmaterialistic biology as the foundation for a renewed natural theology."

List of selected publications 

What think ye of Christ? (1916) 
Christian Socialism, 1848-1854 (1920)
Apollinarianism: An Essay on the Christology of the Early Church (1923)
In Praise of Birds (1925)
The Creator Spirit (1927)
Women and the Ministry (1929)
A Wanderer's Way (1929)
The Life and Teaching of Jesus Christ (1933)
 
Science, Religion, and the Future, a course of eight lectures (1943)
 
Alex Wood: the man and his message (1952)
The Theological Basis of Christian Pacifism. London: The Fellowship of Reconciliation (1952)
Natural Religion and Christian Theology (1953)
Science, Medicine and Morals: A Survey and a Suggestion (1959)
Paul and the Gospel of Jesus (1960) 
Teilhard de Chardin: Scientist and Seer (1962)

See also
 Relationship between religion and science

References

Footnotes

Bibliography

Further reading

External links
 

1885 births
1964 deaths
20th-century Anglican theologians
20th-century Church of England clergy
20th-century English Anglican priests
20th-century English theologians
Academics from London
Alumni of Gonville and Caius College, Cambridge
Anglican chaplains
Anglican clergy from London
Anglican pacifists
Anglican socialists
Christian socialist theologians
Church of England priests
Ecotheology
English Anglican theologians
English Christian pacifists
English Christian socialists
English evangelicals
English military chaplains
Evangelical Anglican clergy
Evangelical Anglican theologians
Evangelical pastors
Fellows of Emmanuel College, Cambridge
Historians of science
Honorary Chaplains to the Queen
Lamarckism
Masters of Christ's College, Cambridge
People from Paddington
Regius Professors of Divinity (University of Cambridge)
Theistic evolutionists
Vice-Chancellors of the University of Cambridge
Writers about religion and science
Writers from London